Bernie Malone (born 26 March 1948) is a former Irish Labour Party politician. She was elected to Fingal County Council in 1979 for the Malahide area. She was elected to the European Parliament for the Dublin constituency at the 1994 European election. Malone was selected as the only Labour Party candidate at the party convention, however the party leader Dick Spring had Orla Guerin added to the ticket which caused some friction between the candidates; Guerin polled well but was not elected. Malone was a member of the Party of European Socialists in the European Parliament. She lost her seat at the 1999 European election to her party colleague Proinsias De Rossa.

Malone was educated by the Dominicans in Eccles Street and earned a BCL from UCD, going on to train as a solicitor. She also holds a degree from the Miltown Institute and an MA from Mater Dei.

References

External links

1948 births
Living people
20th-century women MEPs for the Republic of Ireland
Labour Party (Ireland) MEPs
Councillors of Dublin County Council
Local councillors in Fingal
MEPs for the Republic of Ireland 1994–1999
Politicians from Fingal
People from Malahide
Alumni of University College Dublin
Alumni of Milltown Institute of Theology and Philosophy
Alumni of Mater Dei Institute of Education